is a Japanese actress.

Career
Ando won the award for Best Supporting Actress at the 31st Yokohama Film Festival 2010 for Love Exposure, The Wonderful World of Captain Kuhio and Tsumitoka batsutoka. She was also nominated for the award for best supporting actress at 4th Asian Film Awards 2010 for A Crowd of Three.

She appeared in Kiyoshi Kurosawa's 2012 television drama Penance.

She has also appeared in films such as The Samurai That Night, Our Homeland, and Petal Dance.

In 2015, Ando received the CUT ABOVE Award for Outstanding Performance in Film at JAPAN CUTS: Festival of New Japanese Film in New York.

In 2018, Ando received high praise for her performance as Nobuyo Shibata in director Hirokazu Kore-eda's Shoplifters, being called "fantastic" and "the stand-out", with film critic Simon Abrams stating that "Kore-eda gave Andô her character's (strictly metaphorical) dance steps, but she realizes and owns every maneuver she was asked to (and then some).... No small feat... given how subtly complicated her dance steps are."

Filmography

Film

Television

Awards

Family tree

References

External links
Official profile
 

1986 births
Actresses from Tokyo
Japanese film actresses
Living people
Asadora lead actors